Pinot (pronounced ) is a Burgundian grape family.

Wine grape varieties in the Pinot family 
 Pinot blanc (Pinot bianco, Weißburgunder)
 Pinot gris (Pinot grigio, Grauburgunder)
 Pinot Meunier (Schwarzriesling)
 Pinot noir (Spätburgunder, Pinot nero)
 Pinot Noir Précoce (Frühburgunder)

Biochemistry 
Red-berried Pinot vines are known to not synthesize acetylated or para-coumaroylated anthocyanins, as other grape varieties do, only glucosylated anthocyanins.

See also 
 Terret (grape), a grape vine like Pinot that has mutated into several sub-varieties

References 

Grape varieties

cs:Pinot
es:Pinot
nl:Pinot
pt:Pinot
sl:Pinot
de:Burgunder_(Wein)